Thylactus dentipennis is a species of beetle in the family Cerambycidae. It was described by Wang and Jiang in 1998.

References

Xylorhizini
Beetles described in 1998